The Greatest Power is a lost 1917 silent film drama directed by Edwin Carewe and starring Ethel Barrymore. It was produced and distributed by Metro Pictures.

Cast
Ethel Barrymore - Miriam Monroe
William B. Davidson - John Conrad
Harry S. Northrup - Albert Bernard
Frank Currier - Randolph Monroe
William Black - Bradford Duncan
Cecil Owen - Eric Johansen
Frederick C. Truesdell - Professor Poole
Redfield Clark - Major General Foster
Rudolph de Cordova - Williams
W. M. Armstrong - Captain Herbert

See also
Ethel Barrymore on stage, screen and radio

References

External links

1917 films
American silent feature films
Lost American films
Metro Pictures films
Films directed by Edwin Carewe
American black-and-white films
Silent American drama films
1917 drama films
1917 lost films
Lost drama films
1910s American films